Maurolicus parvipinnis is a species of ray-finned fish in the genus Maurolicus. It is found in the Southeast Pacific off the coast of South America.

References 

Fish described in 1888
Sternoptychidae